La gitanilla ("the little Gypsy girl") is a 1940 Spanish drama film directed by Fernando Delgado. It is based on the short story "La gitanilla", from the collection Novelas ejemplares by Miguel de Cervantes. It was the third film adaptation of the story.

Cast
 Manuel Arbó as F. Francis de Carcamo
 Estrellita Castro as Preciosa
 Concha Catalá as Doña Guiomar de Meneses
 Manuel González as Corregidor

Reception
The film was received negatively by Spanish film critics, who thought it failed on a technical level. It received the award for Best Screenplay from the National Syndicate of Spectacle.

References

1940 films
1940 drama films
Films about Romani people
Films based on Spanish novels
Films based on works by Miguel de Cervantes
Spanish drama films
1940s Spanish-language films
Films scored by Juan Quintero Muñoz
Works based on La gitanilla
1940s Spanish films